The Rudolf Harbig Memorial Award is an annual sports award in recognition of German competitors in the sport of athletics who, in performance and attitude, have been role models for young people. The award was created in 1950, named after German middle-distance runner Rudolf Harbig, who died age 30 fighting for the Wehrmacht in World War II. The award was suggested by the Clubs der Alten Meister (Old Masters Club), a union of former athletes and made official by Karl Ritter von Halt, the former leader of the National Socialist League of the Reich for Physical Exercise. Given by the German Athletics Association (DLV), the award was for West German athletes only prior to German reunification.

The prize may only be awarded once to an athlete, who is selected by an internal German Athletics Association panel. The DLV president gives the award at the German Athletics Championships each year, a tradition started at the championships in 1950. The award was historically mostly been given to men (37 male to 13 female winners in its first 50 years) – prior to 2005, a female winner had succeeded another woman on one occasion only. Men and women have received the honour in roughly equal frequency since 1999.

Winners

References

List of winners
Rudolf-Harbig-Gedächtnispreis. Leichtathletik. Retrieved 2019-07-22.

External links
Official German Athletics Association website

Sport of athletics awards
German sports trophies and awards
Most valuable player awards
Awards established in 1950
1950 establishments in West Germany